Sir Matthew Blakiston, 1st Baronet (c. 1702 – 14 July 1774) was a British merchant, grocer and baronet.

He was the son of George Blakiston and his wife Elizabeth Kay, daughter of Matthew Kay. He was an Alderman of London from 1750 to 1769, was elected Sheriff of London in 1754 and became the 442nd Lord Mayor of London in 1761. He was knighted at Kensington Palace in 1759 and was created a Baronet, of the City of London on 22 April 1763. Blakiston served as colonel of the Green Regiment of the London Militia. He died at Jermyn Street in London.

Blakiston married firstly Margaret Hall, daughter of Reverend Charles Hall. His second wife, Mary Blew, died in 1754 and Blakiston married thirdly Annabella Bayley, daughter of Thomas Bayley in St Johns, London on 8 April 1760. He had a son by his first wife and two sons by his third wife. He was succeeded in the baronetcy by his second and only surviving son, Matthew.

References

1700s births
1774 deaths
Year of birth uncertain
18th-century lord mayors of London
Baronets in the Baronetage of Great Britain
British Militia officers
Royal Fusiliers officers
Sheriffs of the City of London